Tiffany Hsiung is a Canadian documentary filmmaker. She is most noted for her 2016 documentary film The Apology, which won a Peabody Award in 2019, and her 2020 short documentary film Sing Me a Lullaby, which won the Share Her Journey award at the 2020 Toronto International Film Festival, and the Canadian Screen Award for Best Short Documentary at the 9th Canadian Screen Awards in 2021.

In 2018, she was one of eight women filmmakers selected for the Academy of Canadian Cinema and Television's Apprenticeship for Women Directors program, alongside Kathleen Hepburn, Kirsten Carthew, Alicia K. Harris, Allison White, Asia Youngman, Halima Ouardiri, and Kristina Wagenbauer.

See also
 List of female film and television directors

References

External links

Canadian documentary film directors
Canadian women film directors
Film directors from Ontario
Living people
Year of birth missing (living people)
Asian-Canadian filmmakers
Canadian women documentary filmmakers